is a former Japanese football player. His younger brother Masaru is also a footballer.

Playing career
Matsuhashi was born in Isahaya on August 3, 1982. After graduating from high school, he joined J2 League club Oita Trinita in 2001. He played as forward many matches from first season. Although Trinita won the champions in 2002 season and was promoted to J1 League, he could not play many matches from 2002 season. In 2006, he played many matches and scored 10 goals. In 2007, his younger brother Masaru also joined Trinita. Although Matsuhashi played many matches in 2006, his opportunity to play decreased behind Masato Yamazaki in 2007. In 2008, he moved to Vissel Kobe. However he could hardly play in the match. In 2010, he moved to J2 club Roasso Kumamoto. Although he played as regular forward in 2010, he could hardly play in the match in 2011. In 2012, he moved to his local club V-Varen Nagasaki in Japan Football League. V-Varen won the champions in 2012 season and was promoted to J2. However he could hardly play in the match in 2013 and retired end of 2013 season.

Club statistics

References

External links

1982 births
Living people
Association football people from Nagasaki Prefecture
Japanese footballers
J1 League players
J2 League players
Japan Football League players
Oita Trinita players
Vissel Kobe players
Roasso Kumamoto players
V-Varen Nagasaki players
Association football forwards